Newsline is an English language news program, broadcast live on National Broadcasting Services of Thailand (NBT2HD), previously known as Channel 11, on weekdays. It is the longest-running English-language news program in Thailand.

Launched on May 3, 1999, Newsline provides local, international, and sports news, as well as special events interviews on various issues of interest, all in English.

Newsline's main target audiences are foreign expatriates living in Thailand, and Thai nationals with good command of the English language, as well as college and university teachers and students throughout the country.

Newsline's second target group consists of Thais living abroad and foreigners interested in keeping up with events in the Kingdom of Thailand. This group can watch the show through facebook, the social network.

Newsline is divided into three segments: local news, international news, and sports news. Other stories, scoops and tips are also featured after the sports news segment.

References

National Broadcasting Services of Thailand original programming
Thai television shows
1999 Thai television series debuts
1990s Thai television series
2000s Thai television series
2010s Thai television series